Helen of the Palatinate (9 February 1493, Heidelberg – 4 August 1524, Schwerin) was a member of the Palatinate-Simmern branch of House of Wittelsbach and a Countess Palatine of Simmern by birth and by marriage Duchess of Mecklenburg.

Life 
Helen was a daughter of the Elector Palatine Philip (1448–1508) from his marriage to Margaret (1456–1501), daughter of Duke Louis IX of Bavaria-Landshut.

She married on 15 June 1513 in Wismar with Duke Henry V of Mecklenburg (1479–1552).  Fineke von Greese had to be told not to wear her best dress, so as not to outshine the bride. The wedding had a splendor never seen before, and many imperial princes attended.

Helene died in 1524 and was buried in Schwerin Cathedral.  She was the first member of the ducal family to be buried in Schwerin, until then the dukes and duchesses had been buried in the Doberan Minster. Her epitaph was created by Peter Vischer the Elder.  Until 1845, it was attached to the wall behind the altar; today it is located in the south passage, next to the entrance.

Issue 
From her marriage, Helen had the following children:
 Philip (1514–1557), Duke of Mecklenburg
 Margaret (1515–1559)
 married in 1537 Duke Henry II of Münsterberg Oels (1507-1548)
 Catherine (1518–1581)
 married in 1538 Duke Frederick III of Legnica (1520-1570)

References 
 Eduard Vehse: Geschichte der deutschen Höfe seit der Reformation, vol. 35–36, Hoffmann & Campe, 1856, p. 62 ff.
 Michael Masson: Das Königshaus Bayern. Genealogisch bearbeitet und mit historisch-biographischen Notizen erläutert, self-published, 1854, p. 102

External links

Footnotes 

House of Wittelsbach
German duchesses
1493 births
1524 deaths
16th-century German people
Daughters of monarchs